Robin Anthony Jeffrey Eady  (29 November 1940 - 2 August 2017) was a British dermatologist and the world's longest surviving kidney patient after receiving dialysis from the 1960s.

References

External links 
Robin Eady, London King's College

20th-century British medical doctors
British dermatologists
Members of the Order of the British Empire
Fellows of the Royal College of Physicians
Fellows of the Academy of Medical Sciences (United Kingdom)
1940 births
2017 deaths